C. C. Madison was the owner of the Kansas City Packers of the Federal League.

References

Year of birth missing
Year of death missing
Major League Baseball executives
Kansas City Packers
Federal League executives